Awan Setho Raharjo (born 20 March 1997) is an Indonesian professional footballer who plays as a goalkeeper for and captains Liga 1 club Bhayangkara, and the Indonesia national team. He is a Second Police Brigadier in the Indonesian National Police.

Club career

Bali United 
Bali United was his first professional football club. He was brought by his ex-manager in Indonesia U-19, Indra Sjafri to join Bali United.

Persip Pekalongan 
Awan joined Persip Pekalongan for 2016 Indonesia Soccer Championship B. He debuted against PSCS Cilacap .

Bhayangkara FC
Awan moved to Bhayangkara as third choice goalkeeper behind Wahyu Tri Nugroho and Rully Desrian. Awan was loaned out to PSIS Semarang. He played well in four matches with PSIS Semarang. When Wahyu was injured, Awan was called back to Bhayangkara.  
 
Awan's move back to Bhayangkara was a good option in 2017, because he was first goalkeeper in Bhayangkara Awan and found success in the 2017 Liga 1. Because of his impression playing in Bhayangkara Awan he was called by Luis Milla to join Indonesia in Aceh World Solidarity (AWS) Cup 2017.

With Bhayangkara FC, Awan have won Piala Indonesia 2018 in December with a new record of clean sheet in competition.

International career
Awan Setho represented Indonesia at the 2018 AFF Championship.

Career statistics

Club

International

Honours

Club 
Bhayangkara FC
 Liga 1: 2017

International 
Indonesia U-22
 AFF U-22 Youth Championship: 2019
Indonesia
 Aceh World Solidarity Cup runner-up: 2017

References

External links
 
 

Living people
1997 births
Indonesian footballers
People from Semarang
Sportspeople from Central Java
Liga 1 (Indonesia) players
Bali United F.C. players
Bhayangkara F.C. players
PSIS Semarang players
Indonesia youth international footballers
Indonesia international footballers
Association football goalkeepers
Footballers at the 2018 Asian Games
Asian Games competitors for Indonesia